Stahlhammer (German for "Steel Hammer") is a Neue Deutsche Härte band from Austria that formed in 1992. They incorporate elements from hardcore, groove metal, industrial metal and symphonic metal into their songs. The band has to this date released six albums, where the majority of songs are in German. Their latest album is Opera Noir, which was released in March 2006.

History 
Stahlhammer is one of the most popular bands to ever come out of Austria. The band name was originally going to be "Eisenherz", but copyright laws for the German "Prince Valiant" stories prohibited this, though this later became the name of their fourth album. Their first album Killer Instinkt, released in 1995, became widely known throughout Austria and Germany due to the success of their video for the Pink Floyd cover "Another Brick in the Wall". Among Stahlhammer's several covers is a metal-styled version of MC Hammer's famous hit "U Can't Touch This".

Band members

Current members 
Gary Wheeler – vocals, guitars, keyboard, programming
Peter Karolyi – bass
Michael Stoker – drums

Former members 
Niko Stössl – guitar
Thomas Schuler – guitar
Conrad Schrenk – guitar
Georgij Alexandrowitsch Makazaria – vocals

Discography 
Killer Instinkt (1995)
Wiener Blut (1997)
Feind hört mit (1999)
Eisenherz (2002)
Stahlmania (2004)
Opera Noir (2006)

Band members by album 
Killer Instinct:
Gary Wheeler (vocals), Thomas Schuler (guitar), Peter Karolyi (bass), and Michael Stocker (drums)

Wiener Blut:
Georgij Alexandrowitsch Makazaria (vocals), Thomas Schuler (guitar), Peter Karolyi (bass), and Michael Stocker (drums)

Feind hört mit:
Georgij Alexandrowitsch Makazaria (vocals), Conrad Schrenk (guitar), Peter Karolyi (bass), and Michael Stocker (drums)

Eisenherz:
Gary Wheeler (vocals), Niko Stössl (guitar), Peter Karolyi (bass), and Michael Stocker (drums)

Stahlmania:
Gary Wheeler (vocals, guitar), Peter Karolyi (bass), and Michael Stocker (drums)

Opera Noir:
Gary Wheeler (vocals, guitar), Peter Karolyi (bass), and Geoff Dugmore (drums)

References

External links 
Official website

Austrian heavy metal musical groups
Musical groups established in 1992
Austrian musical trios
Nuclear Blast artists